Sheikh Mukhtar was the son of Chaudhry Ashfaq Ahmed (who was a railway police inspector and born in Karachi, British India; now Pakistan) Chaudhary Ashfaq Ahmed intentionally got transferred and  migrated to Delhi. Sheikh Mukhtar was born on 24 December 1914 in Delhi. He had spent his childhood in Gali choodi waalan (Near Jama Mosque, Delhi-110006) and took education from Anglo Arabic School,  Ajmeri Gate, Delhi-11006. His father wanted his son to join the Police or Army on a higher rank, but Sheikh Mukhtar was keenly interested in theatre. One of his acquaintances from his area started working in a theatre company, so Sheikh Mukhtar also moved to Kolkata and joined the company.

A tall and manly figure - he stood 6 feet and 2 inches -, Sheikh Mukhtar played a variety of roles such as "Dada (Contemporary Bhai)." He produced Noor Jehan, in which he played Sher Afghan Quli Khan, the first husband of Queen Nur Jahan. Later, he migrated to Pakistan and there he died. Some of his movies are Bahen, Roti, Bhookh (1947), Ustadon Ke Ustad, Hum Sab Ustad Hai, Halaku, Chenghis Khan, Birju Ustaad,  Do Ustad, Mr. Lambu (1956) (with Suraiya) and Noor Jehan with Meena Kumari. He was basically from the Dholi Khaal area of Saharanpur, Uttar Pradesh. 
He had produced Noor Jahan, a beautiful Hindi movie and he expected it to be hit like Mughal-e-Azam, but his movie flopped badly, which in turn disappointed him and he was heart broken and probably this made him leave to Pakistan. And along with him he took the original prints of Noor Jahan. He settled in Karachi, over the period he lost his eyesight, he turned blind and died in 1980.

References

Pictures of Sheikh Mukhtar: https://www.flickr.com/photos/rashid_ashraf/31926149542/

Male actors in Hindi cinema
1914 births
1980 deaths